Tumar Darrahsi or Tumar Darrehsi may refer to:
 Tumar Darrahsi-ye Olya
 Tumar Darrahsi-ye Sofla